The flavanonols (with two "o"s a.k.a. 3-hydroxyflavanone or 2,3-dihydroflavonol) are a class of flavonoids that use the 3-hydroxy-2,3-dihydro-2-phenylchromen-4-one (IUPAC name) backbone.

Some examples include:
 Taxifolin (or Dihydroquercetin)
 Aromadedrin (or Dihydrokaempferol)
 Engeletin (or Dihydrokaempferol-3-rhamnoside)

Metabolism
 Flavanone 3-dioxygenase
 Flavonol synthase
 Dihydroflavonol 4-reductase

Glycosides 
Glycosides (chrysandroside A and chrysandroside B) can be found in the roots of Gordonia chrysandra. Xeractinol, a dihydroflavonol C-glucoside, can be isolated from the leaves of Paepalanthus argenteus var. argenteus.

Dihydro-flavonol glycosides (astilbin, neoastilbin, isoastilbin, neoisoastilbin, (2R, 3R)-taxifolin-3'-O-β-D-pyranoglucoside) have been identified in the rhizome of Smilax glabra.

References